Cornel Tatu (born July 12, 1983) in Sibiu, is a former Romanian rugby union football player and currently a coach. He played as a flanker.

Club career
During his career, Tatu played mostly for Steaua București in Romania and for București Wolves a Romanian professional rugby union team based in Bucharest that competed in the European Rugby Challenge Cup competition. He ended his career at Stejarul Buzău.

International career
Tatu gathered 12 caps for Romania, from his debut in 2003 against Argentina to his last game in 2013 against Spain. He was a member of his national side for the 6th  Rugby World Cup in 2003, where he played a single match in Pool A against Argentina, which was his debut for the Oaks.

Honours
Steaua București
 SuperLiga: 2003, 2005, 2006
 Romanian Cup: 2006, 2007, 2013

References

External links
 
 
 

1983 births
Living people
Romanian rugby union players
Romanian rugby union coaches
Romania international rugby union players
Rugby union flankers
CSA Steaua București (rugby union) players
București Wolves players
Sportspeople from Sibiu